Føynland is a populated island in Nøtterøy municipality, Norway. Two bridges connect the island to Nøtterøy in the west and Husøy in Tønsberg municipality to the east.

Villages in Vestfold og Telemark
Islands of Vestfold og Telemark